Wimboldsley is a village in Cheshire, England, 2 miles south of Middlewich. The population at the 2011 census was 153.

In 2015, the civil parish amalgamated with Stanthorne to form Stanthorne and Wimboldsley.

A depot for the currently under construction High Speed 2 railway will be situated here.

Geography
A small area in the west of the civil parish falls within the Weaver Valley Area of Special County Value. Adjacent to this area, on the eastern bank of the River Weaver, is the Site of Special Scientific Interest of Wimboldsley Wood.

See also

Listed buildings in Wimboldsley
Lea Hall, Wimboldsley

References

External links

Villages in Cheshire
Former civil parishes in Cheshire
Cheshire West and Chester